Olusanya is a surname. Notable people with the surname include:

Bolajoko Olubukunola Olusanya, Nigerian pediatrician and social entrepreneur
G.O. Olusanya (1936–2012), Nigerian academic, administrator, and diplomat 
Kemi Olusanya (1963–1999), better known as Kemistry, English DJ and record producer
Toyosi Olusanya (born 1998), English footballer